Ghulam Qadir Khan Bhittani is a Pakistani politician from Tank District, who served as a member of the Khyber Pakhtunkhwa Assembly from 2008 to 2013 belong to the Jamiat Ulema-e-Islam (F) (JUI).

References

1968 births
Living people
Pashtun people
Jamiat Ulema-e-Islam (F) politicians
People from Tank Subdivision